Ahamus maquensis is a species of moth of the family Hepialidae. It is found in China.

References 

Moths described in 2004
Hepialidae
Moths of Asia